I Voted for Kodos (often abbreviated IV4K) was an American ska punk and pop punk band, signed to Snapdragon Records.

History 
The band was founded in Madison, Wisconsin in 1999, after the singer-trombonist Rick Bisenius met the guitarist Chris Holdoya at a Reel Big Fish concert. They began playing together when they were in high school and college. The band's  name comes from The Simpsons episode, "Treehouse of Horror VII", in which Homer Simpson says, "Don't blame me — I voted for Kodos." Although known for their tongue-in-cheek material (they have noted that celery is the band's official vegetable), their song lyrics have also tackled serious issues such as murder and teenage depression. Their first album, Close Enough for Ska, is considered the success story of a small independent record label, Close to Nothing, which was founded by three teenagers. The band later signed with Snapdragon Records from Milwaukee and released My New Obsession. Snapdragon Records later re-released all IV4K albums and a "compilation of unreleased and best of" songs.

The band members began shows with informal instruction on how to skank so that the audience would appreciate the style of dance associated with ska music. They toured nationally from 2003-2006, and were placed number 7 in PureVolume's top ten unsigned bands in the US. The band played the 2004–2006 Vans Warped Tours, and the music critic Joe Lynch described their 2006 performance as "freewheeling and energetic". During a separate national tour in early 2006, one music journalist wrote that the band "uses a hot horn section, plenty of guitar and on-the-mark lyrics to fuel a high-energy show."

The band stopped working together in 2007, although Bisenius and Holdoya continued to collaborate on a new band, Firefight, and Bisenius began a solo project, The Faster We Fall.

On Nov. 30th 2013, the band played in Madison, WI and released a 7" called "Dear Chris Demakes, I'm Also Never Going Back to New Jersey."  I Voted for Kodos had a successfully funded Kickstarter on July 31, 2014 to record an E.P. called "Start Your Own Scene."
  Also in 2014, the band played shows in New York and Madison, WI.

Line up
 Rick Bisenius (1999–2007) – lead vocals, trombone, alto saxophone (2005, 2013), tenor saxophone (2000), Moog, piano 
 Lee Gordon (1999-2007) - mellophone, backing vocals, rhythm guitar, French horn (2003-2007), synthesizer
 Nick Rydell (1999–2004, 2007) - alto saxophone, tenor saxophone (2003-2004)
 Tyler Christensen (2004-2007) - lead guitar, backing vocals
 Chris Holdoya (1999-2004, 2007) - lead guitar, synthesizer
 Ross Gilliland (1999-2005, 2007) - bass guitar, upright bass
 Troy Riechenberger (2004-2005, 2007) - drums

Past members
 Dave Bartov (2000–2003) - trumpet
 Tom Kaboski (2000–2003) - tenor saxophone
 Andrew "Dafe" Fenton (2000–2004) - lead guitar
 Calum Lugton (2004–2006) - lead guitar, alto saxophone, backing vocals
 Mo Ollig (2004-2005) - bass guitar
 Seamus Arena (2005-2006) - bass guitar
 Michael Pulling (2006–2007) - bass guitar, keyboards, theremin, Mellotron
 Andrew Anderson (1999–2003) - keyboards, piano, trumpet
 Paul Reinke (1999–2004) - drums
 David Gage (2005-2006) - drums

Touring members
 Brian Lee (1999) - alto saxophone
 Aaron Joneson (2000) - tenor saxophone
 Tim Ford (2000–2001) - drums
 Keith Cronin (2001–2002) - bass guitar
 Dustin Frost (2004) - trombone
 Andy Christoffersen (2004) - drums
 Adam Dettwiler (2004) - bass guitar
 Jim Bower (2005) - trombone
 Rick Reichenberger (2005) - bass guitar, keyboards
 Jeremy Braband (2005–2006) - bass guitar
 Tim Lappin (2006) - bass guitar
 Devin Munson (2005) - drums
 JT Turret (2005–2006) - keyboards
 Andrew Singer (2006) - bass guitar

Timeline

Discography

Albums
 2000: Close Enough For Ska (Close to Nothing. Re-released on Snapdragon Records 2008)
 2006: My New Obsession (Snapdragon Records)

EPs
 2003: Not Penis Cream (Classic Filth. Re-released on Snapdragon Records 2008)
 2013: Dear Chris Demakes, I'm Also Never Going Back to New Jersey
 2014: Start Your Own Scene

Compilations
 2000: Wiskansin: Skankin' Til the Cows Come Home (Trapdoor Records)
 2003: Kicked Squat in the Nuts (Danger Zone Records)
 2006: Best of Minnesota Punk & Ska Compilation
 2007: If You Can't Make It Big.....Just Give Up! (Snapdragon Records)

References

External links
I Voted for Kodos official site
I Voted for Kodos on MySpace
I Voted for Kodos on Discogs

Post–third wave ska groups
Musical groups from Wisconsin
American ska musical groups
American ska punk musical groups